Paulo Fernando de Souza Leite Filho, better known as simply Paulo Filho (born May 24, 1978), is a Brazilian retired mixed martial artist who last competed in the Middleweight division. A professional competitor from 2000 until 2014, Filho was the last WEC Middleweight Champion, and also competed in PRIDE, DREAM, Pancrase, DEEP, Impact FC, and the World Series of Fighting.

Background
Filho was born in Governador Island to a Jewish-Brazilian dad and a Pernambuco native mom, in Rio de Janeiro, he is the only child and was raised in Cocota until he and his family moved to Zona Sul when Filho was eight years old. It was soon after moving to Copacabana in the Zona Sul area of Rio de Janeiro when Filho began training in Brazilian jiu-jitsu at the Carlson Gracie academy, and then also began training in judo, and later mixed martial arts. He did extremely well in judo competitions and also in jiu-jitsu competitions becoming one of Carlson Gracie protege and he received his Black Belt in Jiu-Jitsu from Carlson Gracie himself when he was 20 years old. Filho has stated in several interviews that his career's goal have always been to defend Jiu-Jitsu and specially the Gracie Family as a whole. He has stated that "It is because of this family that I have everything in my life and for that I am forever grateful"
He is well respected in the Brazilian Jiu-Jitsu community not just from fans but from high level competitors that have trained with him and consider him to be one of the best in the world. Filho is also a pit bull lover and has a pit bull tattoo in his stomach.

Mixed martial arts career

PRIDE Fighting Championships
During his stint in PRIDE, Filho was the only undefeated entrant in the 2006 PRIDE Welterweight Grand Prix, but he did not win the tournament as an injury kept him from the tournament finals. In the semi-finals of the tournament on PRIDE Bushido 13, November 5, 2006, Filho defeated Kazuo Misaki by armbar. Unfortunately, Filho suffered a ruptured membrane in his knee during the fight, forcing him to withdraw from the Grand Prix finals match against Denis Kang, who also suffered injury with a torn biceps in the semi-finals. Filho was replaced by Misaki, who went on to defeat an already injured Kang and claim the Grand Prix title.
Filho's most notable wins include Kazuo Misaki, Amar Suloev and Yuki Kondo, as well as Murilo Rua and Ikuhisa Minowa.

World Extreme Cagefighting
He signed with the World Extreme Cagefighting and fought for the vacant middleweight title on August 5, 2007, at WEC 29. Filho defeated Canadian jiu-jitsu fighter Joe Doerksen via TKO (strikes) at 4:07 of the first round. His first title defense occurred at WEC 31, where he was awarded a controversial win over 2-time National Wrestling Champion Chael Sonnen by armbar at 4:55 in the second round. Due to controversy stemming from the fight stoppage (Sonnen's screams of pain were taken as a verbal submission by the referee, despite his objections), Filho was scheduled to face Sonnen again at WEC 33. However, Filho pulled out of this bout because he had checked into a substance abuse rehab facility. Filho faced Sonnen at WEC 36 on November 5 live on Versus. Filho missed weight for this match, however the contest went ahead as a non-title three round fight. Sonnen dominated the fight and took a unanimous decision victory. Throughout the fight Filho seemed disturbed, disoriented, and confused and his team has associated the episode with his extreme weigh cut. After the WEC's middleweight division was absorbed into the Ultimate Fighting Championship in December 2008, Filho became a free agent and decided to take time off as he felt he lost the love for fighting.

DREAM
Filho made his DREAM debut on July 20, 2009, when he took on light heavyweight Melvin Manhoef at Dream 10 in Saitama, Japan. Filho showed great perseverance and a good chin in the fight, weathering an onslaught of strikes from the dangerous Manhoef before executing a powerful takedown that immediately put him in half guard, from which he then swiftly transitioned into a full mount whilst at the same time trapping Melvin's left arm; he quickly secured an armbar to win the bout in the first round.

Filho was scheduled to face Yoon Dong-Sik on October 25, 2009, at Dream 12, but failed to show up and was replaced on the card.

Bitetti Combat
Filho made his debut in one of Brazil's top promotions, Bitetti Combat, on September 12, 2009, at Bitetti Combat's 4th event against Argentinian Alex Schoenauer. Filho controlled throughout the whole fight and pulled off a unanimous decision. He then fought Tatsuhiko Nishizaka on December 12, 2009, at Bitetti Combat 5. He easily took the fight to the ground, controlled and secured a Kimura in the very first round.

He was scheduled to fight Yuki Sasaki in the main event at Bitetti Combat 6 on February 25, 2010, but it was announced on February 22 that he had withdrawn from the bout due to "personal problems". Later that day, it was confirmed that Filho would in fact be fighting Sasaki. Filho then failed to show for the event's weigh-in, forcing a last minute cancellation of his bout with Sasaki.

Bellator Fighting Championships
Filho was scheduled to face Bellator Fighting Championships Middleweight champion Hector Lombard in a non-title bout on May 13, 2010, at Bellator 18, but Filho pulled out of the bout due to visa issues and was replaced by Jay Silva.

Future
Filho made his Heavyweight debut and defeated Chilean newcomer Daniel Villegas on June 4, 2010, via first-round submission due to strikes.
Filho faced Denis Kang on July 17, 2010, for the Australian-based promotion Impact Fighting Championships. They fought to a draw. In what came as a surprise decision to many, Filho was invited to participate in the ADCC submission grappling championship in Nottingham, England. Filho withdrew prior to the event due to injury. Paulo fought Satoshi Ishii on September 14, 2011. The bout was ruled a draw.

Retirement
On October 19, 2011 Filho made the announcement he would be retiring from Mixed Martial Arts and may or may not fight at KSW. During an interview Filho stated the reason for his retirement was his long struggle with substance abuse, he regretted that he was so far from where he could have been in MMA.

Back from retirement
Filho returned from retirement to face former UFC fighter Dave Branch in the World Series of Fighting 2 event on March 23, 2013.  Filho was dominated by Branch in every aspect of the fight and lost a unanimous decision. 
Filho fought André Muniz at the Bitetti Combat 19 event on February 6, 2014. He again lost via a one sided unanimous decision.

Following Melvin Manhoef's knockout of Evangelista Santos at Gringo Superfight 10, Filho, who won their first outing by submission, entered the cage and challenged Manhoef to a rematch. Though Manhoef wasn't asked about the possible fight before the challenge, he later accepted, and GSF promoter Antonio Tolentino announced the rematch would take place in November 2014.

Filho was expected to face Amilcar Alves at Fatality Arena 7 on September 21, 2014. However, Filho was pulled from the bout due to an apparent seizure. In an interview with MMAFighting.com, Filho stated that it was personal issues that prevented him from competing.
Filho's trainer and personal friend Murilo Bustamante has stated that Filho has not "stepped foot at the academy pre-fight" to most of his bouts since WEC days.

Car accident
In 2017 Filho fractured his hip socket and left hand following a car accident where he crashed into another car. He has made a full recovery and spends his time now speaking with children and teaching Jiu-Jitsu in Rio de Janeiro.

Championships and accomplishments

CBJJ World Championships

1999
Black Belt Pesado: 2nd Place

1998
Brown Belt Pesado: 2nd Place

1997
Purple Belt Pesado: 1st Place

CBJJ Brazilian Championships

2000
Black Belt Pesado: 2nd Place

1999
Black Belt Pesado: 2nd Place

1998
Brown Belt Pesado: 1st Place

1996
Blue Belt Pesadíssimo: 1st Place

He got his Black Belt in Judo in '96 from Clube de Regatas Flamengo. His black belt in BJJ was awarded in 1998, from Carlson Gracie.

Mixed martial arts 
PRIDE Fighting Championships
2006 PRIDE Welterweight Grand Prix Finalist
World Extreme Cagefighting
WEC Middleweight Championship (One time, Last)
One successful title defense

Submission grappling 
 Abu Dhabi Combat Club
 2005 ADCC Brazilian Trials Champion

Mixed martial arts record 

|-
| Loss
| align=center| 23–6–3
| André Muniz
| Decision (unanimous)
| Bitetti Combat 19
| 
| align=center| 3
| align=center| 5:00
| Manaus, Amazonas, Brazil
|
|-
| Draw
| align=center| 23–5–3
| Rodney Wallace 
| Draw (time limit expired)
| Selva MMA 2
| 
| align=center| 3
| align=center| 5:00
| Rio Branco, Brazil
| 
|-
| Loss
| align=center| 23–5–2
| David Branch
| Decision (unanimous)
| World Series of Fighting 2
| 
| align=center| 3
| align=center| 5:00
| Atlantic City, New Jersey, United States
| 
|-
| Win
| align=center| 23–4–2
| Murilo Rua
| TKO (punches)
| Best of the Best: Filho vs. Ninja II
| 
| align=center| 1
| align=center| 0:47
| Belem, Brazil
| 
|-
| Draw
| align=center| 22–4–2
| Satoshi Ishii
| Draw 
| Amazon Forest Combat 1
| 
| align=center| 3
| align=center| 5:00
| Manaus, Brazil
| 
|-
| Loss
| align=center| 22–4–1
| Norman Paraisy
| Decision (unanimous)
| X-Combat Ultra: International Grand Prix
| 
| align=center| 3
| align=center| 5:00
| Rio de Janeiro, Brazil
| 
|-
| Loss
| align=center| 22–3–1
| Ronny Markes
| Decision (unanimous)
| International Fighter Championship
| 
| align=center| 3
| align=center| 5:00
| Recife, Brazil
| 
|-
| Win
| align=center| 22–2–1
| Jackson Mora
| Decision (split)
| World Fighting Combat: Pretorian
| 
| align=center| 3
| align=center| 5:00
| Rio de Janeiro, Brazil
| 
|-
| Win
| align=center| 
| Yuki Sasaki
| Decision (unanimous)
| Bitetti Combat 8
| 
| align=center| 3
| align=center| 5:00
| São Paulo, Brazil
| 
|-
| Loss
| align=center| 20–2–1
| Marcos Rogério de Lima
| Decision (unanimous)
| First Class Fight 5
| 
| align=center| 3
| align=center| 5:00
| São Paulo, Brazil
| 
|-
| Draw
| align=center| 20–1–1
| Denis Kang
| Draw (split)
| Impact FC 2
| 
| align=center| 3
| align=center| 5:00
| Sydney, Australia
| 
|-
| Win
| align=center| 20–1
| Daniel Villegas
| TKO (submission to punches)
| Memorial Fight Qualifying
| 
| align=center| 1
| align=center| N/A
| São Paulo, Brazil
| 
|-
| Win
| align=center| 19–1
| Tatsuhiko Nishizaka
| Submission (kimura)
| Bitetti Combat 5
| 
| align=center| 1
| align=center| 3:00
| Barueri, Brazil
| 
|-
| Win
| align=center| 18–1
| Alex Schoenauer
| Decision (unanimous)
| Bitetti Combat 4
| 
| align=center| 3
| align=center| 5:00
| Rio de Janeiro, Brazil
| 
|-
| Win
| align=center| 17–1
| Melvin Manhoef
| Submission (armbar)
| DREAM 10
| 
| align=center| 1
| align=center| 2:35
| Saitama, Saitama, Japan
| 
|-
| Loss
| align=center| 16–1
| Chael Sonnen
| Decision (unanimous)
| WEC 36: Faber vs. Brown
| 
| align=center| 3
| align=center| 5:00
| Hollywood, Florida, United States
| 
|-
| Win
| align=center| 16–0
| Chael Sonnen
| Submission (armbar)
| WEC 31
| 
| align=center| 2
| align=center| 4:55
| Las Vegas, Nevada, United States
| 
|-
| Win
| align=center| 15–0
| Joe Doerksen
| TKO (punches)
| WEC 29
| 
| align=center| 1
| align=center| 4:07
| Las Vegas, Nevada, United States
| 
|-
| Win
| align=center| 14–0
| Kazuo Misaki
| Submission (armbar)
| PRIDE Bushido 13
| 
| align=center| 1
| align=center| 9:43
| Yokohama, Japan
| 
|-
| Win
| align=center| 13–0
| Ryo Chonan
| Submission (armbar)
| PRIDE Bushido 12
| 
| align=center| 1
| align=center| 2:30
| Nagoya, Japan
| 
|-
| Win
| align=center| 12–0
| Gregory Bouchelaghem
| Decision (unanimous)
| PRIDE Bushido 11
| 
| align=center| 2
| align=center| 5:00
| Saitama, Japan
| 
|-
| Win
| align=center| 11–0
| Murilo Rua
| Decision (unanimous)
| PRIDE Bushido 10
| 
| align=center| 2
| align=center| 5:00
| Tokyo, Japan
| 
|-
| Win
| align=center| 10–0
| Ryuta Sakurai
| Submission (armbar)
| PRIDE Bushido 9
| 
| align=center| 1
| align=center| 3:49
| Tokyo, Japan
| 
|-
| Win
| align=center| 9–0
| Amar Suloev
| Submission (armbar)
| PRIDE Bushido 6
| 
| align=center| 1
| align=center| 4:22
| Yokohama, Japan
| 
|-
| Win
| align=center| 8–0
| Akira Shoji
| Decision (split)
| PRIDE Bushido 4
| 
| align=center| 2
| align=center| 5:00
| Nagoya, Japan
| 
|-
| Win
| align=center| 7–0
| Daijiro Matsui
| Decision (unanimous)
| Gladiator FC: Day 2
| 
| align=center| 3
| align=center| 5:00
| Seoul, South Korea
| 
|-
| Win
| align=center| 6–0
| Silmar Rodrigo
| Decision (unanimous)
| Bitetti Combat Nordeste 3
| 
| align=center| 3
| align=center| 5:00
| Rio Grande do Norte, Brazil
| 
|-
| Win
| align=center| 5–0
| Akira Shoji
| Submission (armbar)
| PRIDE 22
| 
| align=center| 1
| align=center| 2:48
| Nagoya, Japan
| 
|-
| Win
| align=center| 4–0
| Yuki Kondo
| Decision (unanimous)
| DEEP: 2nd Impact
| 
| align=center| 3
| align=center| 5:00
| Yokohama, Japan
| 
|-
| Win
| align=center| 3–0
| Ikuhisa Minowa
| Decision (unanimous)
| Pancrase: Proof 2
| 
| align=center| 3
| align=center| 5:00
| Osaka, Japan
| 
|-
| Win
| align=center| 2–0
| Keiichiro Yamamiya
| KO (punches)
| DEEP: 1st Impact
| 
| align=center| 2
| align=center| 0:29
| Nagoya, Japan
| 
|-
| Win
| align=center| 1–0
| Luiz Claudio das Dores
| TKO (submission to punches)
| Heroes: Heroes 1
| 
| align=center| 2
| align=center| N/A
| Rio de Janeiro, Brazil
|

Submission grappling record 

|-
| align="center" style="border-style: none none solid solid; background: #f0f0f0"|Result
| align="center" style="border-style: none none solid solid; background: #f0f0f0"|Opponent
| align="center" style="border-style: none none solid solid; background: #f0f0f0"|Method
| align="center" style="border-style: none none solid solid; background: #f0f0f0"|Event
| align="center" style="border-style: none none solid solid; background: #f0f0f0"|Date
| align="center" style="border-style: none none solid solid; background: #f0f0f0"|Round
| align="center" style="border-style: none none solid solid; background: #f0f0f0"|Time
| align="center" style="border-style: none none solid solid; background: #f0f0f0"|Notes
|-
|Win
| Flavio Almeida
|(Points)
|ADCC Brazilian Trials
|2000
|
|
| -98.9 kg Final
|-
|Win
| Leo Nagao
|(Points)
|ADCC Brazilian Trials
|2000
|
|
| -98.9 kg
|-
|Win
| Fernando Margarida
|(Points)
|ADCC Brazilian Trials
|2000
|
|
| -98.9 kg
|-

References

External links 
 
 Bio

1978 births
Living people
Brazilian male mixed martial artists
Middleweight mixed martial artists
Light heavyweight mixed martial artists
Heavyweight mixed martial artists
Mixed martial artists utilizing judo
Mixed martial artists utilizing Brazilian jiu-jitsu
World Extreme Cagefighting champions
Brazilian practitioners of Brazilian jiu-jitsu
Brazilian male judoka
People awarded a black belt in Brazilian jiu-jitsu
Sportspeople from Rio de Janeiro (city)